Crash And Burn is the second album by the Bombay Rockers released on 1 June 2007. It reached number one in India and Denmark.

Track listing 

 "Intro"
 "Out of Control"
 "Sajna Ve"
 "Ladies 2 The Dance Floor"
 "Beautiful"
 "Lights, Camera, Action"
 "Crash & Burn"
 "Play Me Like Dat"
 "Kushi"
 "Lullaby"
 "Amazin' Girl"
 "Supernatural"
 "Lovesick Part 2"
 "Dhola"
 "Ari Ari (Rock)"

Bombay Rockers albums
2007 albums